

Crown
Head of State - Queen Elizabeth II

Federal government
Governor General - Jeanne Sauvé

Cabinet
Prime Minister -  Brian Mulroney
Deputy Prime Minister - Don Mazankowski
Minister of Finance - Michael Wilson
Secretary of State for External Affairs - Joe Clark
Secretary of State for Canada - David Crombie then Lucien Bouchard
Minister of National Defence - Perrin Beatty
Minister of National Health and Welfare - Jake Epp
Minister of Regional Industrial Expansion - Robert de Cotret
Minister of the Environment - Thomas McMillan then Lucien Bouchard
Minister of Justice - Ray Hnatyshyn then  Joe Clark (acting)
Minister of Transport - John Crosbie then Benoît Bouchard
Minister of Communications - Flora MacDonald then Lowell Murray (acting)
Minister of Fisheries and Oceans - Tom Siddon
Minister of Agriculture - John Wise then Don Mazankowski
Minister of Public Works - Stewart McInnes then Otto Jelinek
Minister of Employment and Immigration - Benoît Bouchard then Barbara McDougall
Minister of Indian Affairs and Northern Development - Bill McKnight
Minister of Energy, Mines and Resources - Marcel Masse
Minister of Veterans Affairs - Gerald Merrithew

Parliament
See: 33rd Canadian parliament then 34th Canadian parliament

Party leaders
Progressive Conservative Party of Canada -  Brian Mulroney
Liberal Party of Canada - John Turner
New Democratic Party- Ed Broadbent

Supreme Court Justices
Chief Justice: Brian Dickson
William McIntyre
Bertha Wilson
Antonio Lamer
Gérard V. La Forest
John Sopinka
Jean Beetz
Claire L'Heureux-Dubé
Gerald Eric Le Dain

Other
Speaker of the House of Commons - John Allen Fraser
Governor of the Bank of Canada - John Crow
Chief of the Defence Staff - General P.D. Manson

Provinces

Premiers
Premier of Alberta - Don Getty
Premier of British Columbia - Bill Vander Zalm
Premier of Manitoba - Howard Pawley then Gary Filmon
Premier of New Brunswick - Frank McKenna
Premier of Newfoundland - Brian Peckford
Premier of Nova Scotia - John Buchanan
Premier of Ontario - David Peterson
Premier of Prince Edward Island - Joe Ghiz
Premier of Quebec - Robert Bourassa
Premier of Saskatchewan - Grant Devine
Premier of the Northwest Territories - Dennis Patterson
Premier of Yukon - Tony Penikett

Lieutenant-governors
Lieutenant-Governor of Alberta - Helen Hunley
Lieutenant-Governor of British Columbia - Robert Gordon Rogers then David Lam
Lieutenant-Governor of Manitoba - George Johnson
Lieutenant-Governor of New Brunswick - Gilbert Finn
Lieutenant-Governor of Newfoundland and Labrador - James Aloysius McGrath
Lieutenant-Governor of Nova Scotia -Alan Abraham
Lieutenant-Governor of Ontario - Lincoln Alexander
Lieutenant-Governor of Prince Edward Island - Robert Lloyd George MacPhail
Lieutenant-Governor of Quebec - Gilles Lamontagne
Lieutenant-Governor of Saskatchewan - Frederick W. Johnson then Sylvia Fedoruk

Mayors
Toronto - Art Eggleton
Montreal - Jean Doré
Vancouver - Gordon Campbell
Ottawa - James A. Durrell

Religious leaders
Roman Catholic Bishop of Quebec - Cardinal Archbishop Louis-Albert Vachon
Roman Catholic Bishop of Montreal -  Cardinal Archbishop Paul Grégoire
Roman Catholic Bishops of London - Bishop John Michael Sherlock
Moderator of the United Church of Canada - Anne M. Squire then Sang Chul Lee

See also
1987 Canadian incumbents
Events in Canada in 1988
1989 Canadian incumbents
 Governmental leaders in 1988
Canadian incumbents by year

1988
Incumbents
Canadian leaders